This is a list of desserts from Turkish cuisine.

See also
 List of desserts

References

Turkish desserts
Desserts